Franz Gottschalk is a Danish guitarist and bassist. He played in the death metal band Illdisposed and is a former member of Volbeat, Dominus and Hypodermic.

Gottschalk who is known under his nickname "Hellboss" was a member of the band Hypodermic with whom he released a record called "In Between". After Hypodermic split up, he founded the death metal band "Deadly Sins" with friends Lars B.(Koldborn), Rasmus, Huhle and Brian Jensen. In the late 1990s, he joined Dominus and played bass on their final record "Godfallos" in 2000. A year later, Dominus split-up and their singer Michael Poulsen founded Volbeat. Gottschalk joined Volbeat in 2002 replacing their original guitarist Teddy Vang. Gottschalk appeared on the first two Volbeat albums The Strength / The Sound / The Songs and Rock the Rebel / Metal the Devil. However, after the recordings of the second album were done, Gottschalk was fired "due to different personalities and working methods off stage," according to a statement on Volbeat's official website. Gottschalk later joined Illdisposed, replacing Martin Thim. He made his debut on the album The Prestige. His exit came in 2011.

Discography 
 Hypodermic - In Between
 Dominus - Godfallos
 Volbeat - The Strength / The Sound / The Songs
 Volbeat - Rock the Rebel/Metal the Devil
 Illdisposed - The Prestige
 Illdisposed - To Those Who Walk Behind Us

References

External links 
 Official Illdisposed website

Danish heavy metal guitarists
Danish heavy metal bass guitarists
Volbeat members
Living people
Year of birth missing (living people)
Place of birth missing (living people)